Young Adult Matters (Korean: 어른들은 몰라요; RR: Eo-reun-deul-eun mul-la-yo) is a 2021 South Korean drama film written and directed by Hwan Lee. It stars Lee Yoo-Mi and Ahn Hee-Yeon. The film premiered on October 24, 2020 at the Busan International Film Festival.

Cast 

 Lee Yoo-Mi as Se-jin
 Ahn Hee-Yeon as Joo-young
 Bang Eun-Jung as Eun-jeong
 Kim Ga-bin as Ga-bin
 Seong-soo Han as Sin-ji
 Joon-seok Heo as Joon-seok
 Park Kang-sub as Sang-seop
 Hwan Lee as Jae-pil
 Seo-ha Kim as Detective
 Choi Eun-kyeong as Pregnant Teacher
 Lee Seung-Yeon
 Noh Susanna

Awards and nominations

References

External links 

 
2021 drama films
South Korean drama films
2020s Korean-language films
2021 films